Hichem Al-Hamdouni (also Hichem Hamdouni, ; born 2 February 1981 in Tunis) is a retired Tunisian taekwondo practitioner. Hamdouni qualified for Tunisia in the men's welterweight category (80 kg) at the 2004 Summer Olympics in Athens by claiming the bronze medal and receiving a berth from the All-Africa Games in Abuja, Nigeria. Hamdouni outclassed Nigeria's Jacob Obiorah in the opening bout before losing out his next match to Turkey's Bahri Tanrıkulu in a tight decision 4–6. With his opponent advancing further into the final round, Hamdouni offered a second chance for an Olympic medal by aggressively defeating Philippines' Donald Geisler in the first repechage bout that left his opponent with a dislocated ankle and a double tendon injury. Following a straightforward triumph over an injured Filipino taekwondo jin, Hamdouni ended his Olympic campaign in the second repechage round with a default loss of 4–12 against Iran's Yousef Karami.

References

External links

1981 births
Living people
Tunisian male taekwondo practitioners
Olympic taekwondo practitioners of Tunisia
Taekwondo practitioners at the 2004 Summer Olympics
Sportspeople from Tunis
21st-century Tunisian people